is a Japanese manga series written and illustrated by Akira Nitta. It was serialized in Kodansha's seinen manga magazine Monthly Morning Two from February 2013 to March 2015, with its chapters collected in three tankōbon volumes.

Publication
Kodansha collected its chapters in three tankōbon volumes, released from November 22, 2013, to April 23, 2015.

Volume list

Reception
Alongside Katsute Mahō Shōjo to Aku wa Tekitai Shiteita, Asobiai ranked 19th on Takarajimasha's Kono Manga ga Sugoi! list of best manga of 2015 for male readers.

See also
Koi no Tsuki—another manga series by the same author.

References

Further reading

External links
 

Kodansha manga
Romance anime and manga
Seinen manga